Johann Jakob Herzog (12 September 1805, Basel – 30 September 1882, Erlangen), was a Swiss-German Protestant theologian.

Herzog studied theology at the University of Basel and Berlin, earning his doctorate at the University of Basel in 1830. In 1835-1846 he was a professor of historical theology at the Academy in Lausanne.  Afterwards he served as a professor in Halle, and eventually (1854), he settled at Erlangen as a professor of church history.

Herzog is remembered for his writings on the history of the Reformation (Zwingli, John Calvin, Johannes Oecolampadius), and for his studies of the Waldensian Church.

Herzog was author of the "Real-Encyklopädie für protestantische Theologie und Kirche" (1853–1868, 22 volumes), of which a new edition, in collaboration with Gustav Leopold Plitt and Albert Hauck, was published from 1877 to 1888 (18 volumes). From 1896 to 1913, Hauck released a third edition of the encyclopedia (24 volumes; Vol 1–22, 1896–1909, with two later supplements). Based on the encyclopedia's third edition, the New Schaff-Herzog Encyclopedia of Religious Knowledge was subsequently published in English from 1908 to 1914 (13 volumes).

Other writings by Herzog 
 Das Leben Johannes Oekolampads und die Reformation der Kirche zu Basel, 1843.
 Die romanischen Waldenser, ihre vorreformatorischen Zustände und Lehren, 1853.
 Abriss der gesammten Kirchengeschichte (3 vols, 1876–1882, 2nd ed., G Koffmane, Leipzig, 1890–1892).

References

External links
 Bio. of Herzog (in German)

1805 births
1882 deaths
People from Basel-Stadt
Academic staff of the University of Erlangen-Nuremberg
Academic staff of the University of Halle
Academic staff of the University of Lausanne
19th-century German Protestant theologians
Swiss Protestant theologians
19th-century German historians
Reformation historians
Contributors to the Schaff–Herzog Encyclopedia of Religious Knowledge
German male non-fiction writers
19th-century male writers